WPPA (1360 AM, "Your News & Sports Leader") is a radio station broadcasting an full-service radio format. Licensed to Pottsville, Pennsylvania, the station has been owned by Pottsville Broadcasting Company since its debut on May 9, 1946, and features programming from CBS News Radio, CBS Sports Radio, and Premiere Networks.  The station can also be heard on "FM 106" (W290DP 105.9 MHz).

References

External links

PPA
Mainstream adult contemporary radio stations in the United States
ESPN Radio stations
Schuylkill County, Pennsylvania
Radio stations established in 1962
CBS Sports Radio stations